
This is a list of players who graduated from the Challenge Tour in 2010. The top 20 players on the Challenge Tour's money list in 2010 earned their European Tour card for 2011.

* European Tour rookie in 2011
T = Tied 
 The player retained his European Tour card for 2012 (finished inside the top 118, or won).
 The player did not retain his European Tour Tour card for 2012, but retained conditional status (finished between 119-150).
 The player did not retain his European Tour card for 2012 (finished outside the top 150).

The players ranked 16th through 20th were placed below the Qualifying School graduates on the exemption list, and thus could improve their status by competing in Qualifying School. Alexandre Kaleka improved his status in this way.

Winner on the European Tour in 2011

Runners-up on the European Tour in 2011

See also
2010 European Tour Qualifying School graduates

External links 
Final ranking for 2010

Challenge Tour
European Tour
Challenge Tour Graduates
Challenge Tour Graduates